Zealandia pustulata subsp. howensis, synonym Microsorum pustulatum subsp. howense, is a subspecies of fern, only occurring on Lord Howe Island. The habitat is the shaded forest understorey. It grows from the ground, or on plants or from rocks. Often seen on decaying tree stumps or moss covered rocks.

References 

Polypodiaceae
Ferns of Australia
Endemic flora of Lord Howe Island
Plants described in 1994